Avalon is a borough in Cape May County, in the U.S. state of New Jersey. It is located on Seven Mile Island. As of the 2020 United States census, the borough's population was 1,243, a decrease of 91 (−6.8%) from the 2010 census count of 1,334, which in turn declined by 809 (−37.8%) from the 2,143 counted in the 2000 census. The borough's population swells to as many as 45,000 during the summer.

Geographically part of the South Jersey region, the community is one of the most affluent communities along the Jersey Shore and is home to some of the most expensive real estate on the East Coast. In 2007, Forbes listed Avalon as the 65th most expensive ZIP Code in the United States. Washingtonian "named Avalon the 'chicest beach' in the mid-Atlantic, the place to see women in diamonds and designer swimwear." A small portion of Avalon is not on Seven Mile Island. The borough and all of the county is part of the Ocean City metropolitan statistical area.

Avalon is known as a South Jersey seashore resort and has the motto "Cooler by a Mile" since it juts out into the Atlantic Ocean about a mile farther than other barrier islands. Alternatively, the motto is because Avalon, at four miles long, is one mile longer than its neighboring town on the southern end of Seven Mile Island, Stone Harbor. It was ranked the seventh-best beach in New Jersey in the 2008 Top 10 Beaches Contest sponsored by the New Jersey Marine Sciences Consortium.

History
Around 14,000 years ago, the barrier islands of Cape May County formed, likely from spits and lines of dunes. Originally a thriving juniper forest occupied by Lenni Lenape Native Americans, the area was purchased by Aaron Leaming in December 1722 for 79 pounds. Known as Seven Mile Beach (which included present-day Avalon and Stone Harbor), it was owned and retained by the Leamings for approximately 100 years. Unconfirmed legends say that pirates buried their bounty on Seven Mile Island, and that Henry Hudson may have dropped anchor somewhere offshore. The island served as a cattle range and was also used for its plentiful timber. The Leamings eventually sold the land, and the island exchanged hands in a number of transactions afterwards. In April 1887, the Seven Mile Beach company was formed. As early as 1893, Avalon was advertised as a resort town. With this rapid development, homes and businesses were erected. The native juniper forest was graded and cut, and the sandy hills were leveled off, making the island mostly flat. Today it is extremely rare to see hills or native juniper in Avalon.

Avalon was incorporated as a borough by an act of the New Jersey Legislature on April 18, 1892, from portions of Middle Township, based on the results of a referendum held two days earlier. The borough was reincorporated on March 6, 1896, and again on May 4, 1897. Another portion of Middle Township was annexed in 1910. On December 27, 1941, portions of Avalon were ceded to Stone Harbor. The borough is named for Avalon of Arthurian legend.

On January 4, 1890, the Commonwealth, piloted by Captain W.S. Willets, sank. This 197-ton ship was en route from New York City to Philadelphia with a cargo of molasses, coffee, tobacco, tea, coconut oil, and camphor. Straying from its course in rough weather, the Commonwealth ran aground in Townsend's Inlet. The crew was rescued and most of the cargo was salvaged. However, after a week trapped in the sandy bottom of the inlet, the ship began to come apart in the waves. Some of the remaining cargo washed ashore and most of it was taken by the early residents of Avalon. The wreck, unable to be recovered, was sold to John Townshend on February 2.

By the early 1900s, the Leaming Railroad bridge was constructed, allowing train connections into the town. This increased the traffic from nearby Philadelphia, Pennsylvania. Around 1944 the West Jersey and Seashore railroad lines merged with the Reading Railroad. This effectively ended the era of travel by train to the island. A hurricane took several streets and Avalon now has a north end beginning at 7th street. In the mid-1950s the Wolfington Family of Philadelphia purchased and operated the Puritan Hotel later enlarged and renamed the Whitebriar Hotel on the beach block at 21st Street. The Whitebriar was managed for two seasons in the mid-1950s, one of the future 'great hosts' of several hotels in the Greater Philadelphia area, Robert C. Bennett. He was the son of another 'famous' hotelier, Claude H. Bennett of the Bellevue Stratford Hotel in Philadelphia. Currently the most widely used method of transportation to and from Avalon is by car or boat; however, buses run on a regular schedule all over the shore towns.

Geography
According to the U.S. Census Bureau, the borough had a total area of 5.06 square miles (13.09 km2), including 4.27 square miles (11.06 km2) of land and 0.79 square miles (2.04 km2) of water (15.53%).

Unincorporated communities, localities and place names located partially or completely within the borough include Peermont.

The borough borders the Cape May County municipalities of Dennis Township, Middle Township, Sea Isle City and Stone Harbor, as well as the Atlantic Ocean.

Demographics

2010 census

The Census Bureau's 2006–2010 American Community Survey showed that (in 2010 inflation-adjusted dollars) median household income was $88,527 (with a margin of error of +/− $20,202) and the median family income was $135,781 (+/− $32,487). Males had a median income of $162,125 (+/− $69,973) versus $46,397 (+/− $17,278) for females. The per capita income for the borough was $99,655 (+/− $18,059). About 1.6% of families and 4.3% of the population were below the poverty line, including 3.1% of those under age 18 and 1.8% of those age 65 or over.

2000 census
As of the 2000 United States census, there were 2,143 people, 1,045 households, and 668 families residing in the borough. The racial makeup of the borough was 98.69% White, 0.14% African American, 0.56% Asian, 0.05% Pacific Islander, 0.05% from other races, and 0.51% from two or more races. Hispanic or Latino of any race were 0.56% of the population.

There were 1,045 households, out of which 12.9% had children under the age of 18 living with them, 56.7% were married couples living together, 5.5% had a female householder with no husband present, and 36.0% were non-families. 33.4% of all households were made up of individuals, and 17.8% had someone living alone who was 65 years of age or older.  The average household size was 2.05 and the average family size was 2.56.

In the borough the population was spread out, with 14.1% under the age of 18, 2.9% from 18 to 24, 16.3% from 25 to 44, 33.9% from 45 to 64, and 32.7% who were 65 years of age or older. The median age was 56 years. For every 100 females, there were 94.8 males.  For every 100 females age 18 and over, there were 91.0 males.

The median income for a household in the borough was $59,196, and the median income for a family was $72,750. Males had a median income of $60,227 versus $39,886 for females. The per capita income for the borough was $50,016.  About 2.2% of families and 4.3% of the population were below the poverty line, including 9.6% of those under age 18 and 0.1% of those age 65 or over.

Government

Local government
The Borough of Avalon is governed within the Faulkner Act, formally known as the Optional Municipal Charter Law, under the Mayor-Council system of municipal government. The borough is one of 71 municipalities (of the 564) statewide that use this form of government. The governing body is comprised of the mayor and the five-member Borough Council. Members of the Borough Council are elected in non-partisan elections to four-year terms on a staggered basis, with either two seats (and the mayoral seat) or three seats coming up for election in odd-numbered years as part of the May municipal election.

, Avalon's mayor is Martin L. Pagliughi, whose term of office ends on June 30, 2023. Members of the Borough Council are Council President Barbara L. Juzaitis (2023), Council Vice President Samuel D. Wierman (2023), Maura H. "Mari" Coskey (2025), John M. McCorristin (2025) and James T. McDermott Jr. (2025).

In July 2015, William G. Burns Jr., was appointed to fill the vacant seat expiring 2017 of David Ellenberg, who resigned from office earlier that mont.

Mayor Pagliughi and Councilmembers Covington and Dean ran unopposed in the May 2011 municipal election. With 245 of 1,330 registered voters participating (turnout of 18.42%) all three candidates were re-elected.

In the May 2013 election, incumbents Ellenberg and Hudanich were re-elected, as newcomer John McCorristin won the seat that had previously been held by Joseph Tipping who didn't run for another term of office.

Federal, state, and county representation
Avalon is located in the 2nd Congressional district and is part of New Jersey's 1st state legislative district.

Politics
As of March 2011, there were a total of 1,307 registered voters in Avalon, of which 206 (15.8%) were registered as Democrats, 676 (51.7%) were registered as Republicans and 425 (32.5%) were registered as Unaffiliated. There were no voters registered to other parties.

In the 2012 presidential election, Republican Mitt Romney received 66.5% of the vote (622 cast), ahead of Democrat Barack Obama with 32.9% (308 votes), and other candidates with 0.6% (6 votes), among the 943 ballots cast by the borough's 1,331 registered voters (7 ballots were spoiled), for a turnout of 70.8%. In the 2008 presidential election, Republican John McCain received 62.4% of the vote (663 cast), ahead of Democrat Barack Obama, who received 35.7% (379 votes), with 1,063 ballots cast among the borough's 1,325 registered voters, for a turnout of 80.2%. In the 2004 presidential election, Republican George W. Bush received 66.1% of the vote (766 ballots cast), outpolling Democrat John Kerry, who received around 32.6% (377 votes), with 1,158 ballots cast among the borough's 1,419 registered voters, for a turnout percentage of 81.6.

In the 2013 gubernatorial election, Republican Chris Christie received 84.0% of the vote (589 cast), ahead of Democrat Barbara Buono with 15.3% (107 votes), and other candidates with 0.7% (5 votes), among the 710 ballots cast by the borough's 1,279 registered voters (9 ballots were spoiled), for a turnout of 55.5%. In the 2009 gubernatorial election, Republican Chris Christie received 64.7% of the vote (547 ballots cast), ahead of both Democrat Jon Corzine with 29.0% (245 votes) and Independent Chris Daggett with 5.0% (42 votes), with 845 ballots cast among the borough's 1,357 registered voters, yielding a 62.3% turnout.

Education

Avalon School District is a public school district that serves students in public school for first through eighth grade. As of the 2018–19 school year, the district, comprised of one school, had an enrollment of 61 students and 13.8 classroom teachers (on an FTE basis), for a student–teacher ratio of 4.4:1. In the 2016–17 school year, Avalon had the smallest enrollment of any school district in the state, with 43 students.

Starting with the 2011–12 school year, in an agreement with the Stone Harbor School District, public school students in grades K–4 from both communities attend school in Stone Harbor while all students in grades 5–8 attend school in Avalon, at Avalon Elementary School.

Students in public school for ninth through twelfth grades attend Middle Township High School in Cape May Court House, as part of a sending/receiving relationship with the Middle Township Public Schools, together with students from Dennis Township, Stone Harbor and Woodbine. As of the 2018–19 school year, the high school had an enrollment of 767 students and 64.6 classroom teachers (on an FTE basis), for a student–teacher ratio of 11.9:1.

Students are also eligible to attend Cape May County Technical High School in the Cape May Court House area, which serves students from the entire county in its comprehensive and vocational programs, which are offered without charge to students who are county residents. Special needs students may be referred to Cape May County Special Services School District in the Cape May Court House area.

The Roman Catholic Diocese of Camden operates Bishop McHugh Regional School, a Catholic K–8 school, in Ocean View, Dennis Township, which has a Cape May Courthouse postal address. It is the parish school of Avalon/Stone Harbor Catholic Church and three other churches.

Transportation

Roads and highways

No Interstate, U.S., state or major county highways serve Avalon. The most significant roads are minor county routes, such as County Route 601 (Avalon Boulevard), which connects the Garden State Parkway and U.S. Route 9 to the oceanfront, and County Route 619, which follows Ocean Drive.

Public transportation
There is also a seasonal trolley service that runs through the seven-mile-long island. Avalon also has multiple NJ Transit bus stops, and is served by the 315 to and from Philadelphia and the 319 that provides service to and from the Port Authority Bus Terminal in Midtown Manhattan.

Climate

According to the Köppen climate classification system, Avalon, New Jersey has a humid subtropical climate (Cfa) with hot, moderately humid summers, cool winters and year-around precipitation. Cfa climates are characterized by all months having an average mean temperature > , at least four months with an average mean temperature ≥ , at least one month with an average mean temperature ≥  and no significant precipitation difference between seasons. During the summer months in Avalon, a cooling afternoon sea breeze is present on most days, but episodes of extreme heat and humidity can occur with heat index values ≥ . During the winter months, episodes of extreme cold and wind can occur with wind chill values < .

The Nor'easter of 1962
In March 1962, a major Nor'easter, the Ash Wednesday Storm of 1962, tore through the U.S. East Coast causing massive ocean swells. Much of Avalon suffered very serious flooding and major coastline loss. Much of the island was under water for four to five days, with damage to homes dependent on the foundation construction of the home and location on the island.

Protection efforts against storms
While there have been many strong storms since 1962, extensive rock jetty construction on Townsends Inlet (as recent as Summer 2006) has mostly succeeded in protecting the inlet-side homes. However, beaches and property facing the ocean at 8th through 12th Streets have struggled to prevent further loss of this barrier island through various anti-erosion schemes, including extending the 8th Street rock jetty, the installation of an artificial reef and the beach replenishment. So far, there has been no more "shrinkage" of the island at this location, but at a very high monetary cost. Several times, in 2015, the causeway leading north from Avalon to Townsends Inlet has been closed by flooding during stormy weather.

Ecology
According to the A. W. Kuchler U.S. potential natural vegetation types, Avalon, New Jersey would have a dominant vegetation type of Northern Cordgrass (73) with a dominant vegetation form of Coastal Prairie (20).

Notable people

People who were born in, residents of, or otherwise closely associated with Avalon include:

 Geno Auriemma (born 1954), head coach of the University of Connecticut Huskies women's basketball team
 Neil Hartman, Comcast Sportsnet personality
 Paul Holmgren (born 1955), former General Manager of the Philadelphia Flyers and current president
 Tim Kerr (born 1960), right winger who played in the NHL for the Philadelphia Flyers
 Ed McMahon (1923–2009), television show host
 Joe Paterno (1926–2012), Penn State football head coach
 Michael W. Rice (born 1945), CEO/Chairman of Utz Quality Foods
 Stephen Sharer (born 1992), YouTube personality
 Ed Stefanski, former General Manager of the Philadelphia 76ers

References

External links

 Avalon Borough website
 Avalon Elementary School
 
 School Data for the Avalon Elementary School, National Center for Education Statistics
 Seven Mile Publishing
 Avalon Chamber of Commerce
 Avalon Borough Facebook Page

 
1892 establishments in New Jersey
Boroughs in Cape May County, New Jersey
Faulkner Act (mayor–council)
Jersey Shore communities in Cape May County
Populated places established in 1892